Blinded by the Light (also known as Music of My Life) is a 2019 British comedy-drama film directed by Gurinder Chadha. It was inspired by the life of journalist Sarfraz Manzoor and his love of the works of Bruce Springsteen. Manzoor co-wrote the script with Chadha and Paul Mayeda Berges. It is based on Manzoor's 2007 memoir Greetings from Bury Park: Race, Religion and Rock N' Roll. Set in the town of Luton in 1987 Britain, the film tells the coming-of-age story of Javed, a British-Pakistani Muslim teenager whose life is changed after he discovers the music of Springsteen. Viveik Kalra stars in the lead role, along with Hayley Atwell, Rob Brydon, Kulvinder Ghir and Nell Williams in supporting roles.

The film premiered at the 2019 Sundance Film Festival and was released by Entertainment One in the United Kingdom on 9 August 2019, and New Line Cinema in the United States and other countries on 16 August 2019 via parent company Warner Bros. Pictures. Blinded by the Light received positive reviews from critics, and also received nominations for Best Film and Best Actor (for Kalra) at the 2019 SIFF Awards.

Plot
In 1987, Javed Khan and his family – Pakistani migrant parents Malik and Noor and sisters Yasmeen and Shazia – live in Luton, England, during the premiership of Margaret Thatcher. Javed likes contemporary rock music, which Malik disapproves of. Javed writes poetry and lyrics for his best friend Matt's band, but Matt criticises Javed's work for being depressing.

Javed feels out of place at his new sixth-form college, where he is one of two South Asian students; the other, Roops, is a fan of "The Boss". In Ms Clay's writing class, Javed develops a crush on a student activist named Eliza and becomes interested in writing as a career. Javed talks to Ms Clay after class about his poetry and diaries. During lunch, Roops approaches him and gives him two Bruce Springsteen s, calling Springsteen "the direct line to all that is true in this shitty world."  Javed faces constant racism from his peers and neighbours, and Malik forbids him to socialise, insisting he "follow the Jews" in his college because of their success as a people.

Javed is denied any opportunity to write for the school paper. Meanwhile, Vauxhall Motors lays off much of their workforce, including Malik who had worked there for sixteen years. His mother takes on extra sewing work to pay the bills. Frustrated by racism and Malik's inability to understand him, Javed discards his poems on the night of the great storm of 1987. After listening to the Springsteen tapes, the lyrics speak to him, and he recovers his poems. At college, Javed excitedly tells Roops that Springsteen knows exactly how he feels. Inspired to continue writing, he shares his poetry with Ms Clay. A neighbour, Mr Evans, recovers one of Javed's poems that decries the National Front as 'scum'. As a World War II veteran, Mr Evans sympathizes with Javed's feelings and calls the poem brilliant, but Javed's parents are less appreciative.

Javed submits a piece about Springsteen to the newspaper, which is accepted. Meanwhile, Malik is worried about finding the money for Yasmeen's upcoming wedding. Javed takes a Saturday job with Matt's father, also a Springsteen fan, on his market stall. Matt's father helps Javed impress Eliza by serenading her with a Springsteen song. In the process, however, Javed upsets Matt by seeming to side with his father as he taunts Matt about his poor musical taste and his band.

Javed asks out Eliza, and, steeling his nerves with Springsteen songs, the two enjoy a night out and kiss. Javed is inspired to write his own poems about Eliza, which she loves. Ms Clay enjoys his poems and article and arranges an unpaid internship for Javed at the Herald. Malik and his wife have to sell her dowry jewellery presumably to cover his lost wages. Yet Malik does not help his wife with the sewing even though he insists Javed and his sisters help. Javed points this out when his dad objects to him taking the unpaid work experience and his dad responds by saying his biggest mistake was moving to the UK.

Javed learns of growing tensions between the Muslim community and the National Front, who have organized a march and hung a pig's head at the local Mosque. Eliza invites Javed to dinner with her conservative and racist parents who imply that she is only with him out of rebellion. Javed later mentions this and says he doesn't care if she is with him for that reason.

At the Herald, Javed gets paid after an article he wrote about racism is chosen for the front page and decides to use the money to buy tickets for a Springsteen concert. On the morning of his sister's wedding, while Javed runs to the shops to buy tickets, his family arrives separately at the venue and National Front members assault Malik. Upset that Javed withheld money from the family and had dishonoured Malik and the wedding, Malik tells Javed to surrender the tickets, but Javed says the tickets are his and they fight. Malik says Javed will go to a university in Luton and Javed states that Luton does not have a university and that he will go to the University of Manchester instead. At this, Malik rips up the tickets. Having had enough of his father, Javed pushes and stuns Malik by telling him he does not want to be his son as he wants to be more than that.

At school, Eliza chastises Javed for abandoning his family on his sister's wedding day, and then for using his family as an excuse for no longer seeing her. In class, Ms Clay tells Javed that his Springsteen essay won him attendance to a lecture at Monmouth College in New Jersey, near where Springsteen grew up. Javed initially declines, knowing his father will not allow him to go, but later changes his mind when he sees racist graffiti on their home. Malik says America is a bad place and tells Javed that if he leaves, he will not be allowed to return.

Javed and Roops enjoy an inspiring trip to the States. Back home, with Javed staying with Roops, Noor tells Malik to reconcile with Javed and reminds him that he left his own family and country at a young age and that she and Malik will ultimately lose Javed should Malik refuse. When Javed is asked to read his essay at a school event, Eliza recruits Javed's family to show up in support. Instead of reading his original essay, Javed talks about being "Blinded by the Light" of Springsteen and his own dreams and being willing to abandon his friends and family along the way. He recognizes his father's struggles and the way his community has shaped him, saying he must "build a bridge to my dreams, but not a wall between my family and me.” Everyone is moved. Javed reconciles with Eliza and thanks her for inviting his family. Malik reconciles with Javed and tells him that he has read Springsteen's lyrics and admires the themes of working hard and respecting one's family. Before going to Manchester, Javed sells his Springsteen memorabilia to reclaim his mother's jewellery. As Javed leaves for university, he and Malik listen to Springsteen together.

Cast

Reception

Box office
Blinded by the Light has grossed $17.2 million.

In Canada and the United States, the film was released alongside Where'd You Go, Bernadette, 47 Meters Down: Uncaged and Good Boys, and was projected to gross around $4 million from 2,307 cinemas in its opening weekend. It made $1.4 million on its first day, and went on to debut to $4.5 million, finishing ninth. Rival studios argued that Warner Bros. should have begun with a limited release to build audience interest, and that the film's August date was too close to that of Yesterday, a film that also depicts a young British Asian male inspired by a classic popular music act.

Critical response
The site's consensus reads: "Like a life-affirming rock anthem, Blinded by the Light hits familiar chords with confidence and flair, building to a conclusion that leaves audiences cheering for an encore." On Metacritic, the film has a weighted average score of 71 out of 100, based on 44 critics, indicating "generally favorable reviews". Audiences polled by CinemaScore gave the film an average grade of "A−" on an A+ to F scale, while those at PostTrak gave it an average 4.5 out of 5 stars.

Johnny Oleksinski of The New York Post calls it "the feel-good movie of the year". Jordan Ruimy of The Playlist calls it "one of the most joyous and exhilarating movies you will see this year". Leah Greenblatt of Entertainment Weekly calls it an ode to "the power of music". Anthony Ray Bench of Film Threat calls it "a feel-good movie that tackles a bunch of tough topics, from politics, race, family traditions, social frustrations, and romance" yet "never feels preachy or overly cheesy." Adam Chitwood of Collider calls it "a rapturously joyous, heartfelt, and genuinely insightful film not just about The Boss, but about the personal nature and power of music."

Owen Gleiberman of Variety calls it "the sort of unguarded drama they used to make in the ‘80s — a coming-of-age tale of unabashed earnestness — but it’s also a delirious and romantic rock ‘n’ roll parable" that is "a more incandescent ode to the life force of pop music than any film ever adapted from the work of Nick Hornby." Bedatri Datta Choudhury of Vague Visages says that, while "Springsteen takes the American dream and helps everyone navigate through its dismantling," Chadha "makes it speak to an entirely different country and a whole new generation."

At the 2019 SIFF Awards in the Seattle International Film Festival, Blinded by the Light received nominations for Best Film (for director Gurinder Chadha) and Best Actor (for Viveik Kalra). In July 2019, Ethan Anderson of /Film listed Blinded by the Light as the eighth best film of 2019 so far. A critics' survey by IndieWire listed Blinded by the Light as one of the eight best films of Summer 2019.

Soundtrack
Springsteen allowed twelve of his songs to be used in the soundtrack and it features several Springsteen rarities, including the first performance of "The River", from the No Nukes concerts at Madison Square Garden in 1979 and an acoustic rendition of "The Promised Land" that Springsteen performed in 2014 at Washington, D.C.'s National Mall. The soundtrack also showcases a number of Springsteen's classics such as "Badlands", "Hungry Heart" and a 1975 acoustic recording of "Thunder Road" performed at The Roxy Theatre.

The soundtrack contains a previously unreleased Springsteen song "I'll Stand by You", which was originally written for inclusion in Harry Potter and the Philosopher's Stone.

Track listing

References

External links
 
 

2019 films
2019 comedy-drama films
2010s coming-of-age comedy-drama films
2010s English-language films
British coming-of-age comedy-drama films
Films based on non-fiction books
Films directed by Gurinder Chadha
Films scored by A. R. Rahman
New Line Cinema films
Warner Bros. films
Entertainment One films
Bruce Springsteen
Films set in 1980
Films set in 1987
Films set in 1988
Films set in Luton
Films set in New Jersey
Films about racism
Pakistani-British culture
Films about interracial romance
Films shot in Bedfordshire
2010s British films